On Liberty is a book published in October 2014 by the civil rights campaigner Shami Chakrabarti.

References

External links
 On Liberty by Shami Chakrabarti – 'I don't trust the powerful' – The Guardian. Published 24 September 2014 by Gaby Hinsliff.

2014 non-fiction books
Books about human rights
Civil rights and liberties in the United Kingdom
Political books
British non-fiction books
Allen Lane (imprint) books